Favriella is a monotypic genus of extinct sea snails, marine gastropod mollusks in the family Raphitomidae.

Species
 † Favriella weberi Hornung, A., 1920

References

External links
 Worldwide Mollusc Species Data Base: Raphitomidae
  Bouchet, P.; Kantor, Y. I.; Sysoev, A.; Puillandre, N. (2011). A new operational classification of the Conoidea (Gastropoda). Journal of Molluscan Studies. 77(3): 273-308

 
Raphitomidae
Gastropods described in 1920